Raritan Township is one of eleven townships in Henderson County, Illinois, USA.  As of the 2010 census, its population was 286 and it contained 134 housing units.

Geography

Cities, towns, villages
 Raritan

Cemeteries
The township contains two cemeteries: Raritan and Saint Patrick's.

Demographics

School districts
 West Central Community Unit School District 235
 West Prairie Community Unit School District 103

Political districts
 Illinois's 17th congressional district
 State House District 94
 State Senate District 47

References
 United States Census Bureau 2008 TIGER/Line Shapefiles
 
 United States National Atlas

External links
 City-Data.com
 Illinois State Archives
 Township Officials of Illinois

Townships in Henderson County, Illinois
Townships in Illinois